James Saunders (1809 - unknown) was a quartermaster in the United States Navy who was awarded the Presidential Medal of Honor for gallantry during the American Civil War. Summers was awarded the medal on 31 December 1864 for actions performed off the coast of Cherbourg, France on 19 June 1864.

Personal life 
Saunders was born in Massachusetts on 1809. His home of residence was listed as Boston. The date and location of his death are unknown.

Military service 
Saunders enlisted in the navy as a quartermaster in Boston, Massachusetts, serving on the sloop-of-war USS Kearsarge. He reached the rank of Chief Quartermaster before his release. On 19 June 1864, USS Kearsarge engaged and sunk CSS Alabama, a privateer run commerce raider, in the Battle of Cherbourg. Saunders was one of 17 men awarded the Medal of Honor for actions performed in the engagement.

Saunders' Medal of Honor citation reads:

References 

United States Navy Medal of Honor recipients
American Civil War recipients of the Medal of Honor
1809 births
Year of death unknown